Limnia unguicornis is a species of fly in the family Sciomyzidae. It is found in the  Palearctic . Mature larvae have been recorded feeding on Succinea putris.

References

External links
Images representing Limnia unguicornis at BOLD

Sciomyzidae
Insects described in 1763
Muscomorph flies of Europe
Taxa named by Giovanni Antonio Scopoli